Samuel Bothwell (born 21 November 1997) is an Irish tennis player.

Bothwell has a career high ATP singles ranking of 1699 achieved on 1 August 2016. He also has a career high ATP doubles ranking of 905 achieved on 6 November 2017.

Bothwell represents Ireland at the Davis Cup, where he has a W/L record of 0–1.

References

External links

1997 births
Living people
Irish male tennis players